As Serious as a Heart-Attack is a 1971 spoken word album by Melvin Van Peebles. This is Van Peebles third studio record.  The album's cover can be briefly glimpsed on the bathroom door in Van Peebles' 1973 film Don't Play Us Cheap.

Track listing
All tracks composed by Melvin Van Peebles

Countryside 1
"Rufus & Ruby"
"Mothers Prayer"
"The Country Brother & The City Sister"  
"Chippin"

Cityside 2
"Just Don't Make No Sense"
"Dearmistuh"
"Love, That's America"
"I Remember"
"My Pal Johnny"

Personnel

Musicians
Rhetta Hughes - guest vocalist on "Mother's Prayer"
Doug Carn - keyboards
John Boudreaux Jr. - drums
Tom Scott, Albert Hall, Jr. - horns
William Henderson - strings
Clydie King, Venetta Fields, Rhetta Hughes, Jessica Smith - backing vocals

Engineers
Robert Appère - recording and mix
Dick Burns - mix
Produced And Conceived By Melvin Van Peebles
All Words And Music By Melvin Van Peebles
All Selections Published By Almo Music Corp./Yeah Inc., Ascap,
Except "Love That's, America," Colgems Music, Ascap
Art Direction: Roland Young
Album Design: Chuck Beeson
Photography: Jim McCrary

References

Melvin Van Peebles albums
1974 albums
A&M Records albums